The minister of Rural Economic Development is a Minister of the Crown in the Canadian Cabinet. It is a new portfolio introduced during the government of Justin Trudeau, in January 2019.

List of ministers

References

Canadian ministers